Silver Screen Classics is a Canadian English language Category B specialty channel owned by Channel Zero Inc. Silver Screen Classics broadcasts films primarily from the 1930s to the 1960s; including feature films, silent films, serials, shorts, and more.

The channel launched in high definition in September 2018 with its launch on IHR Telecom.

See also
Condensed Classics with Dave Shaw

References

  Silver Screen Classics launching Tuesday; Broadcaster Magazine, 8/28/03.
 Silver Screen Classics launching Tuesday; Mediacaster Magazine, 8/28/03.

External links

Channel Zero (company)
Movie channels in Canada
Television channels and stations established in 2003
Digital cable television networks in Canada
English-language television stations in Canada